David Ellis Evans FBA (23 September 1930 – 26 September 2013) was a Welsh scholar and academic. He was born in the Tywy Valley in Carmarthenshire and went to Llandeilo Grammar School.

After studying at Jesus College, Oxford and receiving a doctorate from the University of Oxford, he lectured at the University of Wales, Swansea from 1957 to 1978, rising to become Professor.  In 1978, he returned to Oxford University as Jesus Professor of Celtic and also became a Professorial Fellow of Jesus College.  He was appointed as a Fellow of the British Academy in 1983, having delivered the Academy's Sir John Rhys Memorial Lecture in 1977, named in honour of the first Oxford Celtic Professor.  He retired in 1996.

His particular research interest was early Celtic culture throughout Europe, dealing with its relationship with that of the classical world, and in the history of the Celtic languages and the early literatures of Wales and Ireland.  A volume of essays on these topics by fellow Celticists was published in honour of his 65th birthday in 1995.

References

1930 births
Academics of Swansea University
Alumni of Jesus College, Oxford
Fellows of Jesus College, Oxford
Celtic studies scholars
Welsh scholars and academics
2013 deaths
Fellows of the British Academy
Jesus Professors of Celtic
People from Llandeilo